Einsteinium(III) bromide is the bromide salt of einsteinium. It has a monoclinic crystal structure and is used to create einsteinium(II) bromide. This compound slowly decays to californium(III) bromide.

References 

Einsteinium compounds
bromides